Loppybogymi (pronounced LAH-pee-bow-JYE-me, often just shortened to "Loppy") was a Mobile, Alabama-based alternative metal band made up of Tim Ramenofsky (vocals, guitar), James Orr (bass, vocals), and Gregory Slay (drums, vocals).

History

Formation

Loppybogymi was formed in Mobile, Alabama by Tim Ramenofsky, James Orr, and Gregory Slay in 1988. Frustrated by lack of national exposure  the band relocated to Nashville, Tennessee in September 1991.

Disbandment

The band broke up in 1994. Gregory Slay went on to join Remy Zero. Tim Ramenofsky relocated to Hattiesburg, MS and founded the independent record label, T-Bones Records, most notable for releasing Afroman's first two albums, Because I Got High and Sell Your Dope.

Members
Original Trio:
 Tim Ramenofsky - guitar, vocals
 James Orr - bass, vocals
 Gregory Slay - drums, vocals
Subsequent Members:
 Rick Ranson - Bass (Summer'92)
 Raymond Pitts - bass, trombone, vocals ('92-'94)
 Dave Feathers - drums ('93)
 Michael Gilfone - drums ('93-'94)
 Marty Medved -bass ('94)

Studio albums
Scenic Overlook (1990)
Kelbin: Mississippi Burning Tapes (1992)
Tup (album) (1992)

EPs
Boogy Whip (1989)
Am I Catl? (1991)
Hot Pink Lantin (1992)

Singles
Middleworld (single) (1992)
Undoing/Rubbermade (1992)

Live Recordings
Loppy Lives, Vol 1 (2014)
Loppy Lives, Vol 2 (2014)
Loppy Lives, Vol 3 (2014)

References

Last.fm biography

External links
 
Official Bandcamp page
Concert footage

Musical groups established in 1988
Musical groups disestablished in 1994
Heavy metal musical groups from Alabama
Musicians from Mobile, Alabama
American alternative metal musical groups